Shania Vogt (born 15 February 1999) is a Liechtensteiner footballer who plays as a striker for Balzers and the Liechtenstein national football team.

Career statistics

International

International goals

References

1999 births
Living people
Women's association football midfielders
Liechtenstein women's international footballers
Liechtenstein women's footballers